Electoral district 12, shortened to OVO No.12 is one of 225 electoral districts that elects a member of parliament (people's deputy) to the Verkhovna Rada, Ukraine's national parliament.

Ukraine's electoral system is based on the mixed-member proportional representation system, which stipulates that half of a countries MPs are elected from proportional party lists, with the other half elected from first-past-the-post constituencies. A constituency's votes for a political bloc or party is tallied up with the rest of the 224 constituencies to determine the results of the proportional representation voting.

It was created in 1998 and has only been won by three MPs; former President Petro Poroshenko, who has represented the constituency in three different convocations of parliament, his son Oleksiy Poroshenko, and the current MP Anatoliy Drabovskyi from the Servant of the People party.

Location

The electoral district is located in north-central Vinnytsia Oblast (province) in Ukraine, representing half of the province's administrative center, Vinnytsia, its districts, Leninskyi, Staromiskyi, and Zamostianskyi Raions; the urban-type settlements of Voronovytsia, Desna; and 33 villages.

According to Section III "Territorial Organization of the Elections of Deputies" of Ukraine's electoral law "On the elections of People's Deputies of Ukraine," each of the country's 225 single-mandate constituencies must have an approximately equal number of voters. The constituency's boundaries are determined by the respective "boundaries of administrative units, interests of local communities, and interests of national minorities living in the respective territories."

Demographics
, the constituency's population consisted of 177,067 inhabitants, which is slightly smaller than the 1:196,000 average population ratio of 225 constituencies to Ukraine's 2014 population of 44,291,413.

History
The electoral district was established in 1998 in preparation for the upcoming 29 March parliamentary election, carved out of the No.55 single-mandate constituency after a redistricting. For the 1998, 2002, 2012, and the 2014 parliamentary elections, Ukraine used a mixed-member proportional representation system to elect MPs, with half of the parliament's 450 seats being elected on a proportional representation system, with the other half elected on a first-past-the-post system in 225 single-mandate constituencies.

During the 2006 and 2007 parliamentary elections, all of the 225 single-mandate constituencies were replaced with territorial constituencies. During these elections, Vinnytsia was represented by the No.9 territorial constituency, which was in effect a combination of the 11th and 12th districts of previous elections.

List of deputies

The district is notable since President Petro Poroshenko has been elected to represent it on three occasions, during the parliament's 3rd convocation, 4th convocation, and 7th convocations. The constituency is currently represented by Anatoliy Drabovskyi, from the Servant of the People party.

Election results
Although the No.12 single-mandate constituency was established for four of Ukraine's parliamentary elections, this area is represented by the No.12 territorial constituency for presidential elections, as was the case in 1999, 2004, 2010, and 2014. The territory of this constituency is quite larger and different in its boundaries, representing the province's Vinnytsia Raion (district), and the Zamostianskyi Raion of the city of Vinnytsia itself. Accordingly, this presidential election constituency voted for President Leonid Kuchma in 1999, President Viktor Yushchenko in 2004, front-runner Prime Minister Yulia Tymoshenko in 2010, and President Poroshenko himself in 2014.

1998

In both of the 1998 and 2002 parliamentary elections, the No.12 single mandate district was simply called the No.12 electoral district. In the 1998 elections, the No. 12 constituency voted for the Communist Party of Ukraine, with 18.70% of the vote, while the People's Democratic Party gained 10.90% of the vote, the Party of Greens of Ukraine gained 8.98%, and People's Movement of Ukraine gained 7.65%.

2002
In the 2002 elections, the Our Ukraine Bloc gained a significant portion of the vote with 30.15%, while the Yulia Tymoshenko Bloc was in second place with 20.39%, the Communist Party fell back to third place with 12.95%, and the Socialist Party of Ukraine gained 7.18%.

2012

After a two election year absence of the mixed-member proportional representation system, the constituency was re-established for the 2012 election, and the subsequent 2014 election. In 2012, Fatherland took a large portion of the former Our Ukraine Bloc's vote with 44.29%, while the Ukrainian Democratic Alliance for Reform won 16.90%, Svoboda won 13.36%, the Party of Regions won 12.26%, and the Communist Party placed in a distant fifth with 7.41%.

2014
In 2014, the Petro Poroshenko Bloc gained a significant portion of the constituency's vote, with 44.08%, while the People's Front (made up largely of representatives from the Fatherland party) won 17.96%. Meanwhile, Self Reliance won 10.44%, Svoboda won 5.52%, and Fatherland placed in a distant fifth with 5.18%.

2019
In 2019, the Servant of the People won the majority of the votes with 33.75%, while the Ukrainian Strategy of Groysman (a political party led by then-Prime Minister Volodymyr Groysman won 20.87%.
For this election, the Petro Poroshenko Bloc was reorganized into the European Solidarity, which won only 10.32%. Fatherland, meanwhile, increased its vote share to 7.97%, with the Strength and Honor party coming in at 6.24%. Anatoliy Drabovskyi from the Servant of the People party won the election as the district's MP with 33.22% of the vote.

See also
 Imperative mandate, Ukrainian constitutional provision

References

External links
 
 

Electoral districts of Ukraine
Vinnytsia Oblast
Vinnytsia
Constituencies established in 1998